Glasenapp may refer to:
German name of Godzisław, West Pomeranian Voivodeship
Caspar Otto von Glasenapp (1664-1747), Prussian general
Helmuth von Glasenapp (1891-1963), German scholar
Otto Georg Bogislaf von Glasenapp (1853-1928), German banker
Glasenapp family, nobility from Pommer